James Paul Johnson (born June 2, 1930) is an American politician, lawyer and jurist from Colorado. He served in the United States House of Representatives as a Republican.

Life

James Paul Johnson was born in Yankton, Yankton County, South Dakota. He earned his B.A. from Northwestern University in 1952 and later earned an LL.B. from the University of Colorado in 1959. In 1952 he enlisted into the United States Marine Corps and served as a jet pilot during the Korean War from 1952 to 1956. He became a Christian missionary and went on a mission to convert the Aleutian natives in Alaska.

He was admitted to the Colorado Bar in 1959 and briefly served in private practice prior to being named a deputy district attorney for the Eighth Judicial District of Colorado from 1959 to 1966. He was the Municipal Judge for Ault, Colorado from 1962 to 1965, and assistant district attorney from 1964 to 1966. He served as member of the Poudre R-1 School Board, Fort Collins from 1969 to 1971 and served as delegate to Colorado State Republican conventions from 1960 to 1972.

During the 1972 elections he was elected to the House of Representatives and served until 1981. In February 1978 he apologized for stating that President "Carter didn't declare war on the West(ern United States) he bombed us without a declaration of war." in response to Carter's water project policies.

After leaving office he resumed practicing law in Fort Collins, Colorado. He served as member of the supreme court judicial nominating commission for state of Colorado from 1984 to 1986 and also served as a member of the Colorado Water Conservation Board from 1985 to 1987.

Electoral history

References

External links

1930 births
Colorado state court judges
Colorado lawyers
Living people
Military personnel from South Dakota
Northwestern University alumni
People from Yankton, South Dakota
Politicians from Fort Collins, Colorado
Republican Party members of the United States House of Representatives from Colorado
School board members in Colorado
United States Marine Corps officers
University of Colorado alumni
Military personnel from Colorado